Brazil–Russia relations have seen a significant improvement in recent years, characterized by an increased commercial trade and cooperation in military and technology segments. Today, Brazil shares an important alliance with Russia, with partnerships in areas such as space, military technologies and telecommunications as well.

According to a 2017 Pew Global Attitudes Project survey, 35% of Brazilians have a favorable view of Russia, with 36% expressing an unfavorable view.

Country comparison

History
The first diplomatic relations between Brazil and Russia started on October 3, 1828, being the first South American country with which Russia formalized ties. In 1876, the Emperor of Brazil, Dom Pedro II, paid a private visit to Russia.

The diplomatic relations were interrupted twice: in 1917, after the October Revolution (being reestablished on April 2, 1945) and in 1947 due to the right-wing government of the military Eurico Gaspar Dutra (reestablished in 1961, during the government of Jânio Quadros).

Brazil maintained a neutral, but distant, relationship with the Soviet Union during the Cold War. Their bilateral relations were limited to commercial trade and cooperation agreements of minimal importance. In 1988, José Sarney made the first official visit of a Brazilian Head of State to the USSR.

With the fall of the Soviet Union and the subsequent birth of the Russian Federation, talks between the two nations increased. Brazil was one of the first countries to recognize the Russian Federation as the legal successor of the Soviet Union (December 26, 1991). In 1994, Celso Amorim made the first official visit of a Brazilian Foreign Minister to Russia.

Since then, bilateral relations between Russia and Brazil have been characterized by the positive dynamics of political contacts at all levels. In 1997 the Russian-Brazilian Commission of High Level of Cooperation (CAN) was created, headed by the Head of Government of the Russian Federation and the Vice-President of the Federative Republic of Brazil and regulated by the Brazil-Russia Cooperation Treaty, signed on November 21, 1997. Its operational mechanism is the Intergovernmental Cooperation Commission (CIC).

In June 2000 the two countries signed the Basic Agreement on partnership relations. In 2001, a high-level committee headed by then Vice-President of Brazil Marco Maciel, and then Prime minister of Russia Mikhail Kasyanov, established several long-term bilateral treaties, initiating a strategic partnership between the two countries, and creating the Brazilian-Russian Governmental Commission. In 2002, President Fernando Henrique Cardoso made an official visit to Russia, when the "Strategic Partnership" between the two countries was celebrated. The following year, Minister of Foreign Affairs Igor Ivanov visited Brazil.

Continuing that path, another Vice-President of Brazil, José Alencar, traveled to Moscow in September 2003, to meet with Russian President Vladimir Putin and his senior cabinet members. The two countries signed the Brazil-Russia Military Technology and Transfer Pact, an important agreement in the area of space technology, missile defense, and military weapons transfer.

In response to an invitation made by then Brazilian President Luiz Inácio Lula da Silva, Vladimir Putin made a state visit to Brazil on November 22, 2004, being the first visit of a Russian President in the history of bilateral relations, when the "Technological Alliance" was celebrated between the two countries. On October 18, 2005, during a state visit of President Lula to Moscow, the two heads of state signed the bilateral Brazil-Russia Strategic Alliance, as well as an agreement that made it possible for the Brazilian Space Agency to send the first Brazilian astronaut, Marcos Pontes, into space aboard Soyuz TMA-8.

In 2006, Russian Foreign Minister Sergei Lavrov visited Brazil, when the Memorandum of Understanding for the Establishment of a Mechanism for Political Dialogue and Cooperation between Mercosur and the Russian Federation was signed. On November 26, 2008, during a state visit of then President Dmitry Medvedev to Brazil, the two countries signed agreements on visa exemption, and cooperation in the aerospace, nuclear and defense industries.

The second BRIC summit was held in Brasília, following the first in Russia.

In 2012 President Dilma Rousseff visited Russia. The following year, 185 years were completed since the establishment of diplomatic relations between Russia and Brazil. On this occasion the Russian Foreign Minister and his Brazilian counterpart exchanged messages of congratulations, emphasizing coincidence of positions in the international arena and importance of future development of cooperation. Both countries advocate observance of human rights, democratic values, respect for national sovereignty, primacy of international law, reform of institutes of global economic and financial governance, and consolidation of the central role of the United Nations Security Council.

In 2014 the President of Russia, Vladimir Putin, visited Brazil to participate in the VI BRICS Summit. The following year the Brazilian President, Dilma Rousseff, participated in the VII BRICS Summit in Ufá.

In 2017 the President of Brazil, Michel Temer, paid a visit to Russia. A series of acts were signed, including:

 Joint Declaration of the Federative Republic of Brazil and the Russian Federation on Strategic Dialogue for Foreign Policy; 
 Political Consultation Plan Between the Brazilian Ministry of Foreign Affairs  and the Russian Ministry of Foreign Affairs for 2018–2021; 
 Memorandum of Understanding Between the Brazilian Ministry of Foreign Affairs and the Russian Ministry of Economic Development in the Area of Economic and Investment Cooperation; 
 Protocol Between the Brazilian Ministry of Development, Industry and Foreign Trade and the Russian Federal Customs Service on Cooperation, Information, Exchanges and Mutual Assistance about the Uniform System of Tariff Preferences of the Eurasian Economic Union; 
 Memorandum of Understanding between the Brazilian Federal Revenue Secretariat, the Brazilian Ministry of Finance, and the Russian Federal Customs Service on the Exchange of Information on Goods and Vehicles Circulating between the Federative Republic of Brazil and the Russian Federation.

In February 2022, Brazilian President Jair Bolsonaro visited Russia. He met Russian President Vladimir Putin. At the center of the talks, the economic alliance between the two countries since Russia is a major purchaser of Brazilian beef, while Russia supplies significant amounts of potash fertilizer to the Brazilian nation. According to the Moscow State Institute of International Relations, Brazil has been identified as a strategic partner in Latin America, which includes military cooperation.  Both President Bolsonaro and aspiring president Lula da Silva seek close relations with Russia on all levels of government. Bolsonaro stated that Brazil was in “solidarity” with Russia. The Russian Federation likewise emphasized the 'pragmatic approach' of bilateral relations that put ideological differences aside.

In July 2022, Bolsonaro opposed sanctions on Russia following the 2022 Russian invasion of Ukraine and stated that Russia backed Brazil's position on the sovereignty of the Amazon.

Current relations 

In recent years, the relationship between the countries has been significantly widened through visits by senior officials, multilateral dialogue (UN, G-20, BRICS), increased trade and cooperation, especially in aerospace and technical-military matters. Brazil and Russia are "Strategic Partners and Technological Allies".

The two countries are committed to achieving US$10 billion in trade. In 2012, the bilateral exchange registered almost US$6 billion. The number of Brazilian companies installed in Russia has grown significantly. Cooperation in sanitary and phytosanitary matters has advanced, benefiting the trade of meat as Russia is one of the largest importers of beef and pork produced in Brazil.

Brazil and Russia have converging positions on many issues on the international agenda, sharing the conviction that it is necessary to reform the structures of global governance, with a view to building an institutional architecture more consistent with the contemporary world.

The consolidation of the BRICS grouping is one of the axes of relations between Brazil and Russia. Initially seen as a purely economic concept, BRICS presents itself today as a platform for political coordination in proposing solutions to international challenges. Both countries are committed to advancing two BRICS cooperation projects - the New Development Bank and the Contingent Reserve Arrangement.

Cultural cooperation is also a sizeable aspect of the bilateral relationship. Since 2008, annual editions of the Brazilian Film Festival have been held in Russia. Russia has contributed to the training of Brazilian dancers, within the framework of the partnership created when the Bolshoi Ballet School branch opened in the city of Joinville (2001). The prospect of expanding the network of Portuguese and Russian languages in the main Russian and Brazilian universities demonstrates the growing mutual interest of students.

Brazil has an embassy in Moscow and Russia has an embassy in Brasilia.

In February 2022, Brazil voted in favour of a draft United Nations Security Council resolution condemning Russia's invasion of Ukraine. However,  Former Brazilian President Jair Bolsonaro  declined to condemn Russian's  invasion of Ukraine. Brazil will not take sides, Bolsonaro said.

Common membership in international organisations

BIS • BRICS • IAEA • IBRD • ICAO • ICRM • IDA • IFC • IFRCS • IHO • ILO • IMF • IMO • Inmarsat • Intelsat • Interpol • IOC • IOM • ISO • ITU • LAIA • NSG • PCA • UN • UNCTAD • UNESCO • UNHCR • UNIDO • UNITAR • UNTAET • UNWTO • UPU • WCO • WHO • WIPO • WMO

See also

Foreign relations of Brazil
Foreign relations of Russia
BRICS

References

Further reading
Hershberg, James G. 2020. "Soviet-Brazilian Relations and the Cuban Missile Crisis." Journal of Cold War Studies.

External links

 The Sino-Brazilian Principles in a Latin American and BRICS Context: The Case for Comparative Public Budgeting Legal Research Wisconsin International Law Journal, 2015
 Informational Project about Brazil
 Russian Embassy in Brasília
 Ministry of Foreign Relations of Brazil
 Brazilian Embassy in Moscow

 
Russia
Bilateral relations of Russia